Maria Lodi Barrett is a United States Army lieutenant general who serves as the Commanding General of the United States Army Cyber Command since May 3, 2022. She most recently served as Commanding General of the Network Enterprise Technology Command in Fort Huachuca, Arizona. She is the elder sister of Major General Paula Lodi. Barrett and Lodi are the United States Army's first ever sister General Officer tandem.

Early life
Barrett grew up in Franklin, Massachusetts, outside of Boston. She is the daughter of Ruston Lodi, an Italian immigrant, World War II veteran, Silver Star recipient, and school teacher; and Clara Lodi, an educator.

Barrett graduated from Tufts University with a Bachelor of Arts in International Relations. She also earned a Master of Science in National Resource Strategy from the Industrial College of the Armed Forces (Eisenhower School), and a Master of Arts in Telecommunications Management from Webster University.

Military career
Barrett received a commission in the United States Army as a second lieutenant through the Army ROTC program in 1988. 
She has command experience at the company, battalion, and brigade level. Barrett served as deputy director of Current Operations, J-3, United States Cyber Command (USCYBERCOM), Deputy Commanding General for the Joint Force Headquarters—Cyber (JFHQ-C) with United States Army Cyber Command (ARCYBER), and Deputy Commander (Operations) for Cyber National Mission Force (CNMF), USCYBERCOM. She also served as Commander, 160th Signal Brigade, Third United States Army, Chief Information Officer/Director, J-6 with United States Southern Command at Doral, Florida and Director, J-3 with White House Communications Agency. She has served in army assignments in the United States, Kuwait, the Republic of Korea, Germany, and Saudi Arabia. She is a veteran of Operation New Dawn, Enduring Freedom and Operation Desert Shield/Desert Storm. Barrett was promoted to brigadier general on December 2, 2015, and to major general on August 2, 2018.

Personal life
Barrett is married to retired Lieutenant Colonel Brian T. Barrett, a former Signal Corps Officer. She has four siblings. Her younger sister, Paula Lodi, is a United States Army major general.

Awards and commendations
 Army Distinguished Service Medal
 Defense Superior Service Medal 
 Legion of Merit
 Bronze Star Medal
 Defense Meritorious Service Medal with one oak leaf cluster
 Meritorious Service Medal with three oak leaf clusters
 Army Commendation Medal with one oak leaf cluster
 Joint Service Achievement Medal
 Army Achievement Medal
 Joint Meritorious Unit Award
 Signal Regiment's Bronze Order of Mercury.

References

|-

Living people
People from Boston
Recipients of the Defense Superior Service Medal
Recipients of the Legion of Merit
United States Army generals
United States Army personnel of the Gulf War
United States Army personnel of the War in Afghanistan (2001–2021)
Year of birth missing (living people)
Military personnel from Massachusetts